Southside, Tennessee may refer to the following places in Tennessee:
Southside, Hardin County, Tennessee
Southside, Montgomery County, Tennessee